"Just Like Me" is the first single from Jamie Foxx's third studio album Intuition. It features rapper T.I., who co-wrote the song with its producers, Tricky Stewart & The-Dream. This is the second collaboration between the two after "Live in the Sky" off T.I.'s fourth studio album King.

Background
The song was originally written for Usher and there is a leaked version of his record.

Song Concept

"Two can play that game" is the basis for this song. It tells the story of a man who has discovered his significant other's infidelities. He states that she is wrong for her actions and behavior. This would come across as a double standard because he is a "Casanova". Questions arise if his female-companion has brought her Paramour into their home and Porsche car. Also, did she allow him personal use of the vehicle. However, he admits that his mistress has been in their home. Plus, she was given permission to drive the car.

Now aware of her philandering, his female-companion's activities become apparent to him: flirting/hugging random men and romps in the back of nightclubs. Since he partakes in the same endeavors (with women), he knows that it would be hypocritical to criticize her. Still, he struggles to accept that he was a cuckold. Eventually, he comes to the realization that he and his female-companion are just alike; Hence, the title of the song, "Just Like Me".

Music video
The music video was directed by Brett Ratner. It was released on November 26, 2008. The theme is Jamie Foxx engaged in a series of "anything you can do, I can do better" style contests with Taraji P. Henson. The video ranked at #73 on BET's Notarized: Top 100 Videos of 2009 countdown.

Remix
The official remix is a mash-up version of Usher's first verse from his version of the song and also features Jamie Foxx's 2nd verse and T.I.'s verse from the original version.

Charts

Weekly charts

Year-end charts

Release history

References

External links
Music video for "Just Like Me" on Music Video Cast.com

2008 singles
Jamie Foxx songs
T.I. songs
Music videos directed by Brett Ratner
Songs written by T.I.
Songs written by The-Dream
Songs written by Tricky Stewart
Song recordings produced by Tricky Stewart
2008 songs
J Records singles